Yuzha is a town and the administrative center of Yuzhsky District in Ivanovo Oblast, Russia, located on Lake Vazal,  southeast of Ivanovo, the administrative center of the oblast. Population:

History
A settlement on place of modern Yuzha existed since the beginning of the 15th century. The village of Yuzha was first mentioned in 1628. Town status was granted to it in 1925.

Administrative and municipal status
Within the framework of administrative divisions, Yuzha serves as the administrative center of Yuzhsky District, to which it is directly subordinated. Prior to the adoption of the Law #145-OZ On the Administrative-Territorial Division of Ivanovo Oblast in December 2010, it used to be incorporated separately as an administrative unit with the status equal to that of the districts.

As a municipal division, the town of Yuzha, together with five rural localities in Yuzhsky District, is incorporated within Yuzhsky Municipal District as Yuzhskoye Urban Settlement.

References

Notes

Sources

External links
Unofficial website of Yuzha 

Cities and towns in Ivanovo Oblast
Vyaznikovsky Uyezd